Night Shift (French: Service de Nuit, Italian: Turno di notte) is a 1944 French-Italian comedy film directed by Jean Faurez and starring Gaby Morlay, Jacques Dumesnil and Vivi Gioi. The film's sets were designed by the art director René Moulaert.

Synopsis
In a small village in Savoy, the astute night telephone operator knows all the local intrigue and cleverly manipulates them—but doesn't reveal a word.

Cast  
Gaby Morlay as Suzanne
 Jacques Dumesnil as 	Pierre Jansen
 Vivi Gioi as Hélène Jansen
 Jacqueline Pagnol as 	Marcelle 
 Yves Deniaud as	Victor
 Gabrielle Fontan as 	Maria
 Marcelle Hainia as 	Madame Sandoz
 Jean Daurand as 	René Favier
 Albert Duvaleix as 	Le brigadier 
 Georges Pally as 	Monsieur Sandoz 
 Robert Dhéry as Arthur, le chanteur 
 Paul Frankeur as 	Un réparateur de ligne
 Henri Charrett as 	Le chef de gare 
 Raymone as Joséphine, la bonne des Sandoz
 Mona Dol as 	Mathilde, la sage-femme
 Rolande Gardet as Odette, la fiancée d'Arthur
 Lucien Gallas as 	Paul Rémy
 Louis Seigner as 	Le docteur Renaud 
 Julien Carette as Auguste Masson 
 Pierre Collet as 	Un réparateur de ligne 
 Simone Signoret as 	Une danseuse à la taverne

References

Bibliography
 Burch, Noël & Sellier, Geneviève. The Battle of the Sexes in French Cinema, 1930–1956. Duke University Press, 2013.
 Hayward, Susan. Simone Signoret: The Star as Cultural Sign. Continuum, 2004.

External links

1944 films
French black-and-white films
1944 comedy films
1940s French-language films
French comedy films
Italian comedy films
Italian black-and-white films
Films directed by Jean Faurez
1940s Italian films
1940s French films